14th Rifle Division can refer to:

14th Rifle Division (Soviet Union)
14th Guards Rifle Division